Bo Prefecture may refer to:

Bo Prefecture (Anhui) (亳州), a prefecture between the 7th and 20th centuries in modern Anhui and Henan, China
Bo Prefecture (Shandong) (博州), a prefecture between the 6th and 13th centuries in modern Shandong, China 
Bo Prefecture (Guizhou) (播州), a prefecture between the 7th and 12th centuries in modern Guizhou, China

See also
Bozhou, modern city in Anhui named after the historical prefecture
Bozhou (disambiguation)
Bo (disambiguation)